The 1991 Mello Yello 500 was the 26th stock car race of the 1991 NASCAR Winston Cup Series and the 32nd iteration of the event. The race was held on Sunday, October 6, 1991, before an audience of 159,000 in Concord, North Carolina, at Charlotte Motor Speedway, a 1.5 miles (2.4 km) permanent quad-oval. The race took the scheduled 400 laps to complete. Running on fumes, Junior Johnson & Associates driver Geoff Bodine would manage to run the final 76 laps of the race on one tank of fuel to take his 11th career NASCAR Winston Cup Series victory and his only victory of the season. To fill out the top three, Robert Yates Racing driver Davey Allison and owner-driver Alan Kulwicki would finish second and third, respectively.

With a poor finish from Dale Earnhardt's nearest competitor in the driver's championship standings, Ricky Rudd, Earnhardt was considered the favorite to win the driver's championship, having a 138-point lead over Rudd.

Background 

Charlotte Motor Speedway is a motorsports complex located in Concord, North Carolina, United States 13 miles from Charlotte, North Carolina. The complex features a 1.5 miles (2.4 km) quad oval track that hosts NASCAR racing including the prestigious Coca-Cola 600 on Memorial Day weekend and the NEXTEL All-Star Challenge, as well as the UAW-GM Quality 500. The speedway was built in 1959 by Bruton Smith and is considered the home track for NASCAR with many race teams located in the Charlotte area. The track is owned and operated by Speedway Motorsports Inc. (SMI) with Marcus G. Smith (son of Bruton Smith) as track president.

Entry list 

 (R) denotes rookie driver.

Qualifying 
Qualifying was split into two rounds. The first round was originally scheduled to be held on Wednesday, October 2, at 5:00 PM EST, but was delayed to Thursday, October 3, at 8:30 AM EST due to rain. Each driver would have one lap to set a time. During the first round, the top 20 drivers in the round would be guaranteed a starting spot in the race. If a driver was not able to guarantee a spot in the first round, they had the option to scrub their time from the first round and try and run a faster lap time in a second round qualifying run, held on Thursday, October 3, at 1:30 PM EST. As with the first round, each driver would have one lap to set a time. For this specific race, positions 21-40 would be decided on time, and depending on who needed it, a select amount of positions were given to cars who had not otherwise qualified but were high enough in owner's points; up to two were given. If needed, a past champion who did not qualify on either time or provisionals could use a champion's provisional, adding one more spot to the field.

Six drivers would fail to qualify.

Full qualifying results

Race results

Standings after the race 

Drivers' Championship standings

Note: Only the first 10 positions are included for the driver standings.

References 

1991 NASCAR Winston Cup Series
NASCAR races at Charlotte Motor Speedway
October 1991 sports events in the United States
1991 in sports in North Carolina